A Token of His Extreme (Soundtrack) is a live album by American musician Frank Zappa, recorded on August 27, 1974 at KCET, Los Angeles, California and posthumously released in November 2013 by the Zappa Family Trust on Zappa Records. It is a soundtrack to the concert film of the same name released five months earlier.

Track listing

Personnel

Musicians 
 Frank Zappa – guitar, vocals
 Napoleon Murphy Brock – tenor saxophone, flute, vocals
 George Duke – keyboards, vocals
 Tom Fowler – bass guitar
 Chester Thompson – drums
 Ruth Underwood – marimba, vibraphone, percussion

Sources 
 1974 Stereo Analog Master

References 

Frank Zappa live albums
2013 soundtrack albums
Albums published posthumously
2013 live albums